Sudhir Singla (born 13 October 1965) is an Indian politician. He was elected to the Haryana Legislative Assembly from Gurgaon in the 2019 Haryana Legislative Assembly election as a member of the Bharatiya Janata Party.

Family 
Sudhir's father Late Sh. Sita Ram Singla , joined R.S.S. and thereafter, he started rendering his services at grass root level in B.J.P. and held the post of Vice President, B.J.P. Haryana. He was also President of Haryana B.J.P. Disciplinary committee. In the year 1975, due to the emergency he went to jail by invoking Satyagraha. In 1987, he contested assembly election from Gurgaon assembly seat and held the post of MoS and remained as Sports Minister, I.T.I. minister and also remained as Chairman, Khadi Gram Udyog. In year 1996, in coalition government with H.V.P., he remained as Chairman of Haryana bureau of enterprises. He belongs to village Mozabad. In year 2016, in the same village, government in its own campus, started functioning I.T.I.

Early life and education 
Sudhir was born on 13 October 1965. He is married to Mrs. Sunita Singla. He was the member of ABVP in his college days. He has two children, Vivek and Divya Singla. He completed his LLB from Meerut University.

Career 
Sudhir is also member of executive committee of Aggarwal Dharamshala, Gurugram. He is holding post of District Vice President, B.J.P., Gurugram. He has been practicing civil law since year 1994 at District Courts, Gurugram.

References 

1966 births
Living people
Bharatiya Janata Party politicians from Haryana
People from Gurgaon
Haryana MLAs 2019–2024